USS Tech Jr. (SP-1761), sometimes written as ID-1761, was a United States Navy patrol vessel in commission during the latter half of 1917.

Tech Jr. was built as a private motorboat of the same name in 1912 by Adolph Apel at Atlantic City, New Jersey. On 30 August 1917, the U.S. Navy leased her from her owners, L. & T. Prettyman  of Cambridge, Maryland, for use as a section patrol boat during World War I. She was commissioned as USS Tech Jr. (SP-1761).

Assigned to the 5th Naval District, Tech Jr. apparently was unsatisfactory for naval service and served on patrol duties there only briefly. She was returned to her owners on 27 November 1917 and stricken from the Navy List simultaneously .

Notes

References

NavSource Online: Section Patrol Craft Photo Archive Tech Jr. (SP 1761)

Patrol vessels of the United States Navy
World War I patrol vessels of the United States
Ships built in Atlantic City, New Jersey
1912 ships